"I Got You Babe" is a song performed by American pop and entertainment duo Sonny & Cher and written by Sonny Bono. It was the first single taken from their debut studio album, Look at Us (1965). In August 1965, the single spent three weeks at number one on the Billboard Hot 100 in the United States where it sold more than one million copies and was certified Gold. It also reached number one in the United Kingdom and Canada.

In 1985, a cover version of "I Got You Babe" by British reggae-pop band UB40 featuring American singer Chrissie Hynde peaked at number one on the UK Singles Chart and reached number 28 on the US Billboard Hot 100 chart. And in 1993, Cher recorded a cover version with the American animated characters Beavis and Butt-Head, which peaked at number 35 in the UK and became a top 10 hit in the Netherlands.

Sonny & Cher version

Background and composition
Sonny Bono, a songwriter and record producer for Phil Spector, wrote the lyrics to and composed the music of the song for himself and his then-wife, Cher, late at night in their basement. When Cher was woken up to sing the lyrics, she hated the song and didn't think it would soon be a hit and immediately went back to bed. Session musicians known as The Wrecking Crew supplied the instrumental track. "I Got You Babe" became the duo's biggest single, their signature song, and a defining recording of the early hippie countercultural movement.  Billboard said of the song "using the successful combination of folk and rock, this one has the performance and production of a smash."

AllMusic critic William Ruhmann praised the song: Recalling Dylan's bitter 1964 song "It Ain't Me Babe" (soon to be a folk-rock hit for the Turtles), Bono wrote his own opposite sentiment: "I Got You Babe." Where Dylan was lyrically complex, Bono was simple: His lyrics began with the ominous youth-versus-grownups theme of "they" who set up barriers to romance, but soon gave way to a dialogue of teenage romantic platitudes. Where Dylan was musically simple, however, Bono, without fully rebuilding Spector's Wall of Sound, was more structurally ambitious, following the song's standard verse-chorus-verse-chorus-bridge-verse-chorus form with an ascending coda that built to a climax, then started building again before the fadeout, all in only a little over three minutes. Set to waltz time, the tune retained a light feel despite the sometimes busy instrumentation, led by a prominent oboe accompanied by a bassoon and the alternating vocals between the two singers. If neither were interesting singers, their plodding, matter-of-fact performances gave the song a common-man appeal. 

The session for the song was held on June 7, 1965, at Gold Star Studios in Hollywood and lasted between 2 and 5 PM. Musician Harold Battiste provided the instrumental arrangement. Richard Niles quotes Battiste as saying the prominent figure in the song is played on an oboe rather than an ocarina.

In the United States, the song had sold more than 1 million copies in 1965 being certified Gold by the RIAA. As of November 2011, Billboard reported the digital sales of "I Got You Babe" to be 372,000 in the US.

In 2011, the song was named as one of the greatest duets of all time by both Billboard and Rolling Stone magazines. It was also listed at #444 on Rolling Stones list of the 500 Greatest Songs of All Time in 2004.
But in a 2011 poll Rolling Stone readers ranked "I Got You Babe" the eighth-worst song of the 1960s.
In early 2017 the song has been inducted into the Grammy Hall of Fame.

Live performances
Sonny and Cher last performed the song together during an impromptu reunion on NBC's Late Night with David Letterman on November 13, 1987. Cher performed the song with R.E.M. on February 14, 2002, at the Kodak Theatre in Los Angeles. It was her first performance of the song without Sonny. During Cher's 2014 Dressed to Kill Tour and 2017–2020 Las Vegas residency Classic Cher using left behind vocals and a projection of videos of Sonny, Cher performed the song live with the projection of Sonny. The song is performed the same way during Cher's 2018-2020 Here We Go Again Tour.

Cher sang a parody version of the song called I Got You Bae with James Corden on The Late Late Show with James Corden in 2016. The parody explained finding love in the modern 2016 era of online dating, swiping, social media, Netflix and chill and internet pornography.

In popular culture
"I Got You Babe" has been frequently featured in film and television, including Sonny and Cher's own The Sonny & Cher Comedy Hour. The song made a bit of a comeback when it was used repeatedly as Phil Connors' wake-up music in the 1993 movie Groundhog Day. On re-release, the single re-charted in the UK, reaching number 66. Other films have used the song, including Good Times which stars Sonny & Cher, Buster, The Muppets episode Pig Out, Look Who's Talking Too, Just Visiting, Me Without You, Riding in Cars with Boys, Jack and Jill and The Munsters.

Personnel
The personnel, excluding Sonny & Cher, as seen in the American Federation of Musicians (AFM) contracts for the session include:
 Harold Battiste – arrangement
 Barney Kessel – guitar
 Steve Mann – guitar
 Donald Peake - guitar
 Ervan Coleman - guitar
 Don Randi - piano
 Michel Rubini – harpsichord
 Lyle Ritz – bass guitar
 Clifford Hils - upright bass
 Frank Capp – drums
 Julius Wechter – percussion
 Warren Webb - oboe
 Morris Crawford - bassoon

Charts

Weekly charts

Year-end charts

Certifications

!scope="col" colspan="3"| Digital
|-

UB40 and Chrissie Hynde version

Background
Twenty years later, in July 1985, British band UB40 with American singer Chrissie Hynde released a cover version of "I Got You Babe" for the group's sixth studio album, Baggariddim (1985). This version charted at number one on the UK Singles Chart and reached number 28 on the US Billboard Hot 100 chart. The song also appeared on the Pretenders' 1987 compilation album The Singles.

Track listings
 7-inch single
 I Got You Babe 3:08
 UB40 - Theme From Labour Of Love 3:05

 12-inch single
 I Got You Babe 3:09
 UB40 - Red Red Wine 5:21

Charts

Weekly charts

Year-end charts

Certifications

Cher with Beavis and Butt-Head version

Background
In 1993, Cher recorded a cover version of "I Got You Babe" with the American animated characters Beavis and Butt-Head. The song was the first single from The Beavis and Butt-Head Experience, a compilation comedy album released in 1993 by the Geffen Records, which is one of the fastest-selling comedy albums; it has officially sold 1,610,000 units and was certified 2× Platinum by the RIAA in the United States. The single reached the top 40 in the UK, Belgium and Sweden, as well as the top 10 in the Netherlands.

Critical reception
A reviewer from AllMusic felt "I Got You Babe" is the "most interesting" track on The Beavis and Butt-head Experience album. Larry Flick from Billboard stated that Cher "delivers one of her strongest vocals to date." Troy J. Augusto from Cashbox viewed it as a "fun moment" from the album. Rob Fiend from the Gavin Report called it "a lovely duet", adding that "one can hardly keep the tears from flowing." In his weekly UK chart commentary, James Masterton wrote, that "MTVs doyens of bad taste, Beavis and Butt-Head charge onto vinyl in their own inimitable fashion on a remake of the 1960s classic." Pan-European magazine Music & Media described it as "a smashing rendition". Martin Aston from Music Week gave it four out of five, writing that it "is undoubtedly the worst version of her and Sonny's classic Sixties cut, but the funniest too. Potential media exposure for this irreverent novelty item seems unlimited." A reviewer from Rolling Stone said that "Cher proves she's a good sport (or something) by letting B&B help her sing". Mark Sutherland from Smash Hits declared it as a "hilarious" duet. Rob Sheffield from Spin found that "Cher herself shows up to chat about Sonny" and "croon a truly mind-boggling" "I Got You Babe".

Music video
A funny and psychedelic music video was produced for the song, which received heavy MTV airplay. It featured Cher and Beavis and Butt-Head in a virtual animated world. In the video, the animated pair refer to her former husband Bono as a dork and a wuss, to which a live-action Cher agrees. It was placed at number 5 on the "50 Greatest Funny Moments in Music" list made by VH1 channel in 2004. On April 29, 2022, Cher's official YouTube channel uploaded the music video in remastered HD.

Track listing
 European CD single
"I Got You Babe" (Cher with Beavis and Butt-Head) – 5:09
"Mental ✳@%#!" (Jackyl) – 4:42
"Fire Down Below" (Cher) – 4:20

 UK CD and cassette single
"I Got You Babe" (Cher with Beavis and Butt-Head) – 4:00
"I Got You Babe" (Sonny & Cher) – 3:13

Charts

Weekly charts

Year-end charts

Blackmore's Night 
In 2013, the band Blackmore's Night, which features guitarist Ritchie Blackmore and singer Candice Night, covered the song on their album All Our Yesterdays.

 Personnel  
 Ritchie Blackmore : Electric and acoustic guitar, guitar solo
 Candice Night : Lead vocals
 Lady Lynn : Harmony vocals
 Earl Grey of Chimay : Bass guitar
 Scarlet Fiddler : Fiddler 
 Bard David of Larchmont : Keyboards, backing vocals
 Troubador of Aberdeen : Percussions

In other media
In the Good Times episode "The Evans Get Involved (Part 2)", characters perform the song while mimicking The Sonny & Cher Comedy Hour
In the film Groundhog Day, it is this song to which the main character awakes each morning
 The House episode "We Need the Eggs" ends with two characters performing the song
 In the video game The Last of Us: Left Behind, the Etta James cover of the song is featured in the final section of the game's flashback storyline The song was featured again In the seventh episode of the television adaptation of The Last of Us. Neil Druckmann, the creator and writer of the game and the co-creator of the show, felt the song's romantic lyrics hidden by joyous music mirrored the feelings of Ellie and Riley.:56:28  
 The song was featured during the final scene of the Mad Men episode "Tomorrowland"
 The song was performed on an episode of The Golden Girls by Dorothy (Bea Arthur) and her mother (Estelle Getty) for a talent show.
 The song was performed by Dr. Bunsen Honeydew and Beaker in The Muppets episode Pig Out when they were having a karaoke night with the other Muppets and Ed Helms.
 The Etta James version was used by Walmart for its 2021 holiday ad campaign.
 The proto-punk band The Dictators covered the song on their debut album "Go Girl Crazy!" in 1975.

References

1960s ballads
1965 singles
1985 singles
1993 singles
Songs written by Sonny Bono
Sonny & Cher songs
Cher songs
Manfred Mann songs
David Bowie songs
Ramones songs
UB40 songs
Merril Bainbridge songs
Shaggy (musician) songs
Billboard Hot 100 number-one singles
Cashbox number-one singles
Number-one singles in Australia
Dutch Top 40 number-one singles
Number-one singles in New Zealand
UK Singles Chart number-one singles
RPM Top Singles number-one singles
Male–female vocal duets
Pop ballads
Irish Singles Chart number-one singles
1965 songs
Atco Records singles
Geffen Records singles
Song recordings with Wall of Sound arrangements